In probability theory, a random measure is a measure-valued random element. Random measures are for example used in the theory of random processes, where they form many important point processes such as Poisson point processes and Cox processes.

Definition 
Random measures can be defined as transition kernels or as random elements. Both definitions are equivalent. For the definitions, let  be a separable complete metric space and let  be its Borel -algebra. (The most common example of a separable complete metric space is )

As a transition kernel 

Being a transition kernel means that
For any fixed , the mapping

For every fixed , the mapping

is a measure on 

Being locally finite means that the measures

satisfy  for all bounded measurable sets 
and for all  except some -null set

In the context of stochastic processes there is the related concept of a stochastic kernel, probability kernel, Markov kernel.

As a random element 
Define

and the subset of locally finite measures by

For all bounded measurable , define the mappings

Note that .

Basic related concepts

Intensity measure 

For a random measure , the measure  satisfying

The intensity measure exists for every random measure and is a s-finite measure.

Supporting measure 
For a random measure , the measure  satisfying

The supporting measure exists for all random measures and can be chosen to be finite.

Laplace transform 
For a random measure , the Laplace transform is defined as

for every positive measurable function .

Basic properties

Measurability of integrals 
For a random measure , the integrals

and

for positive -measurable  are measurable, so they are random variables.

Uniqueness 
The distribution of a random measure is uniquely determined by the distributions of

For a fixed semiring  that generates  in the sense that , the distribution of a random measure is also uniquely determined by the integral over all positive simple -measurable functions .

Decomposition 
A measure generally might be decomposed as:

Here  is a diffuse measure without atoms, while  is a purely atomic measure.

Random counting measure
A random measure of the form:

This random measure describes the set of N particles, whose locations are given  by the (generally vector valued) random variables . The diffuse component  is null for a counting measure.

In the formal notation of above a random counting measure is a map from a probability space to the measurable space  a measurable space. Here  is the space of all boundedly finite integer-valued measures  (called counting measures). 

The definitions of expectation measure, Laplace functional, moment measures and stationarity for random measures follow those of point processes. Random measures are useful in the description and analysis of Monte Carlo methods, such as Monte Carlo numerical quadrature and particle filters.

See also
 Poisson random measure
 Vector measure
 Ensemble

References 

Measures (measure theory)
Stochastic processes